Dubay may refer to:

People
Bill DuBay (1948–2010), American comic-book editor, writer and artist
John Baptiste DuBay (1810–1887), American fur trapper
Matt Dubay, a litigant in the Matt Dubay child support case
Thomas Dubay (1921–2010), American Catholic priest, author and retreat director 
William DuBay (born 1934), controversial American Catholic priest and activist

Other uses
Lake DuBay, a reservoir in Wisconsin, United States
United States v. DuBay, a 1967 case which established procedure in courts-martial

See also
Dubai, the United Arab Emirates